Gunjur  is a small coastal town in south-western Gambia. It is located in Kombo South District in the Western Division.  As of 2009, it has an estimated population of 17,520.

Climate
Gunjur has a tropical savanna climate (Aw) with no rainfall from November to May and heavy to very heavy rainfall from June to October.

References

Populated places in the Gambia